Kenya D. Williamson (born )  is an American novelist, short fiction author, screenwriter and actress. Her works of fiction include Depth of Focus: A Novel, Checked Out and Drive. She often posts excerpts of her works in progress on Scribd. Her acting highlights include roles in House M.D., Yes, Dear, Commuters and The Girls' Room.

Biography 
Williamson graduated from Neshaminy High School in Langhorne, Pennsylvania and was awarded an Outstanding Achievement Scholarship by Temple University in Philadelphia where she studied theater and journalism. Currently, she writes short fiction, novels and screenplays. She's appeared in dozens of commercials, including Comcast, Lowe's, Honda, Tylenol and Taco Bell.

Filmography 
 House M.D. (2005) - Nurse
 Commuters (2005) - Byanca Johnson
 Target (2004) - Miss Demmings
 Yes, Dear (2003) - Wendy
 Mister Sterling (2003) - Executive Assistant
 The Girls' Room (2000) - Zoe
 Red Handed (1999) -  Paramedic
 Saved by the Bell: The New Class (1998) - Amanda
 The Players Club (1998) - Student
 Working (1997)
 Living Single (1997)
 One Eight Seven (1997)

Trivia 
Williamson wrote and co-starred in the web series "Ernie's Girls." She voiced the 9-year-old character Lorrin for Health Nuts Media's animated project. She was selected as a semi-finalist for Film Independent's Project: Involve in Spring 2008 and was mistakenly credited as Kenya Williams in 1998's The Players Club. She began playing the violin at age 8.

External links 
 
 Kenya D. Williamson website
 Excerpts of Kenya's writing on Scribd
 Kenya D. Williamson at Smashwords
 Kenya D. Williamson at Goodreads
 Kenya D. Williamson author page at Amazon.com
 Kenya D. Williamson at TVGuide.com

Living people
21st-century American novelists
Novelists from Pennsylvania
Actresses from Pennsylvania
American women novelists
Screenwriters from Pennsylvania
Temple University alumni
People from Bucks County, Pennsylvania
Year of birth missing (living people)
American television actresses
African-American actresses
American film actresses
21st-century American women writers
21st-century American screenwriters
21st-century African-American women writers
21st-century African-American writers